Sher Mohammad Abbas Stanikzai (born 1963) is a senior member of the Afghan Taliban and the country's Deputy Minister of Foreign Affairs since 7 September 2021.

He was an officer in the Afghan National Army after training at an army academy in India. He defected from the army and joined Islamic movements to fight the Soviets in Afghanistan. He was a deputy cabinet minister in the first Taliban government. He has been a senior member of the Taliban's political office in Doha since it was set up in 2012, and was its head from 2015 to 2020. He speaks English, Urdu, Pashto, and Dari and has travelled widely to other countries as a Taliban political representative. On 7 September, Sher Abbas was appointed as the Deputy Minister of Foreign Affairs.

Biography and early life
Stanikzai was born in 1963 in the Abbas Qala area of the Baraki Barak district, in the Logar Province of Afghanistan. He is the son of Pacha Khan and is an ethnic Pashtun of the Stanikzai subtribe. He studied political science in Afghanistan, gaining a master's degree. He can speak English, Urdu, Pashto, and Dari.

He trained as a soldier at the Army Cadet College of the Indian Army at Nowgaon in India for three years from 1979 to 1982 under an Indo-Afghan cooperation programme. He was also an officer cadet for a year and a half with the Keren Company of the Bhagat Battalion at the Indian Military Academy in Dehradun, one of 45 foreign cadets in the Keren Company. The Indian Military Academy trained cadets from a number of other countries in Asia and Africa. His fellow cadets nicknamed him "Sheru". After graduating he was a lieutenant in the Afghan National Army.

He defected from the army to fight against the Soviets in the Soviet–Afghan War, first with Mohammad Nabi Mohammadi's Islamic and National Revolution Movement of Afghanistan, then with Abdul Rasul Sayyaf's Islamic Union for the Liberation of Afghanistan, as commander of its south-western front. He had a role with Sayyaf in liaison with Pakistani military intelligence. He was more urbane than most Afghan mujahideen, and when in Quetta, Pakistan, in the 1980s he often dined at restaurants with his wife. Other mujahideen gossiped about this; in return Stanikzai criticised them for old-fashioned ideas about keeping women secluded in their homes.

Taliban rule (1996–2001)
Stanikzai joined the Taliban in the 1990s. After they took power in 1996 he served as deputy minister of foreign affairs under foreign affairs minister Wakil Ahmed Muttawakil. Though he was reportedly not trusted by Muttawakil, he often interviewed foreign media, as he speaks English well. He traveled to Washington, D.C. as acting foreign minister in 1996 to ask the Clinton administration to extend diplomatic recognition to Taliban-ruled Afghanistan. In 1998 he reportedly drew the ire of Taliban leader Mohammed Omar, possibly related to issues of abuse of power and a loose attitude to alcohol, and was removed from his position and placed under house arrest. However, his connections with the Pakistani military intelligence agency, which had influence over the Taliban leadership, worked in his favour and a few months later he was appointed as deputy minister of health, albeit a less important position than in foreign affairs. Stanikzai denied misconduct and put his change of role down to routine ministerial changes.

Taliban political representative, 2001–2021

Stanikzai arrived in Qatar with Tayyab Agha and others in January 2012 to facilitate the opening of the Taliban's political office in that country. On 6 August 2015 he was appointed acting head of the political office, replacing Agha, who had resigned. After his appointment, Stanikzai pledged his allegiance to Akhtar Mansour, saying "I and other members of the Political Office of the Islamic Emirate declare allegiance to the honorable Mullah Akhtar Mansoor." He was confirmed in his position as head of the political office in November 2015.

From July 18–22, 2016, he traveled to China for talks with Chinese officials. In February 2017, Stanikzai was denied entry to the United Arab Emirates.

From August 7 to 10 2018, Stanikzal led a delegation of Taliban officials to Uzbekistan. The delegation met with Uzbekistan's Foreign Minister Abdulaziz Kamilov and Uzbekistan's special representative to Afghanistan Ismatilla Irgashev. From August 12–15, he traveled to Indonesia for talks with officials, meeting Indonesian First Vice President Muhammad Jusuf Kalla, Indonesia Foreign Minister Retno Marsudi and Hamid Awaluddin, Indonesia's special representative for Afghanistan. He became the deputy head of the office in September 2020, replaced by Abdul Hakim Ishaqzai.

Taliban rule (2021–present)
Stanikzai addressed Afghanistan on national television and radio on August 30, 2021, where he spoke of the Taliban's desire for friendly relations with the United States, NATO, and India, further stating that he would not allow Pakistan to use Afghan territory in its cold conflict with India. Stanikzai also spoke of the country's Sikhs and Hindus, stating that they can live peacefully and hoping that those who left will return.

During a televised speech in September 2022, Stanikzai urged the government to reopen schools for girls, saying that there is no religious justification to prevent female education.

References

Taliban leaders
1963 births
Living people
Afghan diplomats
Afghan expatriates in India
Afghan expatriates in Qatar
Indian Military Academy alumni
Pashtun people
People from Logar Province
Taliban government ministers of Afghanistan